Dafydd Llwyd Sybylltir was a 17th-century Welsh poet, from the Sybylltir area of Anglesey. He is known to have composed a number of love poems, written in free metre.

References 

17th-century Welsh poets
Welsh male poets
People from Anglesey
17th-century male writers